Colonel Charles Stoddart (23 July 1806 in Ipswich – June 1842 in Bukhara) was a British officer and diplomat. He was a famous British agent in Central Asia during the period of the Great Game.

Stoddart, the son of Major Stephen Stoddart (1763–1812), was educated at Norwich School and later commissioned into the Royal Staff Corps from Royal Military College, Sandhurst, in 1823.

Dispatched on a mission to persuade the Emir of Bukhara to free Russian slaves and sign a treaty of friendship with Britain, he was first arrested by the Emir Nasrullah Khan in 1838. In November 1841 Captain Arthur Conolly arrived in Bukhara with part of his remit to attempt to secure Stoddart's release. He was unsuccessful. Both men were executed on charges of spying for the British Empire on 24 June 1842.

In 1845, the Rev Joseph Wolff, who had undertaken an expedition to discover the two officers' fate and who barely escaped with his life, published an extensive account of his travels in Central Asia which made Conolly and Stoddart household names in Britain for years to come.

Stoddart is commemorated in the scientific name of a species of Sri Lankan lizard, Ceratophora stoddartii.

References
Notes

Bibliography
Peter Hopkirk, The Great Game, Kodansha International, 1992, p. 565The timeline of the Great Game is available online.
Tom Bissell, Chasing the Sea, Vintage, 2004, pp 247–253
Stephen M. Bland Does it yurt? Travels in Central Asia or How I Came to Love the Stans, Hertfordshire Press, 2016, 
Leonard Arthur Bethell, Tales from the Outposts – Vol 1, Frontiers of Empire. Edinburgh: Blackwood. 1st edition 1932, pp 267–268.
Joseph Wolff, Narrative of a mission to Bokhara, in the years 1843–1845, to ascertain the fate of Colonel Stoddart and Captain Conolly. London: J. W. Parker, 1845. First and second (revised) edition both came out in 1845.Reprints:
New York: Harper & Bros., 1845
Edinburgh and London: William Blackwood & Sons, 1848
New York: Arno Press, 1970 
Elibron Classics, 2001)
A mission to Bokhara. Edited and abridged with an introduction by Guy Wint. London: Routledge & Kegan Paul, 1969. 

1806 births
1842 deaths
Royal Staff Corps officers
People educated at Norwich School
Graduates of the Royal Military College, Sandhurst
British diplomats
Executed military personnel
Great Game